Indrajit Kumar (born 21 October 1987) is an Indian cricketer. He made his first-class debut for Bihar in the 2018–19 Ranji Trophy on 20 November 2018.

References

External links
 

1987 births
Living people
Indian cricketers
Bihar cricketers
Place of birth missing (living people)